Karoondi (Sindhi:ڪرونڊي) is a small town along Mehran Highway in District Khairpur, Sindh province of Pakistan. It is situated in taluka Faiz Ganj which is one of the eight talukas of the District. The town lies between two canals: Faiz Ganj canal passes by its western side whereas Veeho canal passes by the eastern. This city was established by Rajpar Hindu and Muslim community. In 1904 Along with Relatives and all family of Usman Khan Rajper settled here from Beela Wah, Naushahro feroze District and Oman Khan Rajpar settled here from Warhecho, Nawabshah district. There are fertile farmlands around it owned by descendants of Wadeero Budhal khan Rajper, Wadeero Oman Khan Rajpar and Wadeero Usman khan Rajper and a number of villages in the outskirts. The main town is separated from the bypass bus stop by farm-fields and orchards. The town is relatively peaceful as the crime rate is very low.
In late 60's Wadeero Allahdad Rajpar made a Phool Bagh in Karoondi. 
The settlement in the town is either on the lands of Wadeero Budhal Khan Rajpar or Wadeero Oman Khan Rajpar.
Late Shahnawaz Khan Rajpar,
late Shaukat Ali Rajpar,
Habibullah khan Rajper,
Punjal Khan Rajper,
Mumtaz Hussain Rajper,
Ghulam Rasool Rajper,
Akhtar Khan Rajpar,
Balam Khan Rajpar,
Aslam Khan Rajpar,
Nisar Ahmed Rajper,  
Late Ghulam Haider Khokhar (Ex Head Master High School Karoondi)
are prominent figures of the town.

Etymology
But some old men say Karoondi is also a full meaningful word mean a man who sleeps in C shape.
Some old tribers think there is a canal in a C shape, so that is why old people called it Karoondi Wahh.

Demographics 
The town has a population of about 40,000 people. Islam is the dominant religion but there is a significant number of Hindus such as Marwari clan and Ode. They live in ghettoized neighborhoods of the town. Sindhis constitute the majority ethnic group whereas Punjabis have a significant population but have assimilated into the Sindhi culture and are not distinguished.

Among the notable tribes and clans are Rajper, Mallah, Soomro, Mangi, Kumbher, Iboopota, Khokhar, Rajput, and Awan. The Rajper tribe is the dominant tribe in the area and the town is also under de facto control of Rajper landlords and zemindars who own vast tracts of fertile land around the town and elsewhere.

Sites of interest 
 Shahi Bazaar is the longest shopping street among the towns of the area.
 Phool Baagh is a garden park that was built by late Allahdad Khan Rajper after he was inspired by Shalimar Baagh, Lahore. It is the only park in the area.
 Jamia Masjid Karoondi is a magnificent congregational mosque also built by Allahdad Khan Rajper.

Education 
 Govt High School Karoondi is a co-educational school that provides education up to the level of matriculation.
 Govt Degree Science College Karoondi is the only graduation and post-graduation college in taluka Faiz Ganj. It was the result of the efforts by Syed Ali Madad Shah Rashidi, former chief minister Sindh. With its inception in 1994 this degree College got significant achievements in terms of providing quality higher education to the extent that from the first batch two students got selected in medical colleges named Dr Muhammad Idris and Dr Arif who both are the among the top medical professional of the world.

 A number of entrepreneurial schools are also offering primary education to the local children in addition to the Govt-run schools. The land for Govt educational institutions was donated by late Shahnawaz Khan Rajper.

Adjacent cities and towns 
The nearest city is Nawabshah which is about 80 km to the south and has an airport. Pacca Chang and Akri are the nearest adjacent towns whereas Bhirya road, Thari Mirwah, Padidan, Mehrabpur and Naushahro Feroze are notable towns in the proximity. Bhirya Road Railway Station is the nearest railway station only 13 km away.

References

Populated places in Khairpur District